The Charter of the International Military Tribunal – Annex to the Agreement for the prosecution and punishment of the major war criminals of the European Axis (usually referred to as the Nuremberg Charter or London Charter) was the decree issued by the European Advisory Commission on 8 August 1945 that set down the rules and procedures by which the Nuremberg trials were to be conducted. This then served as a model for the Tokyo Charter issued months later against the Empire of Japan.

The charter stipulated that crimes of the European Axis Powers could be tried. Three categories of crimes were defined: crimes against peace, war crimes, and crimes against humanity. Article 7 of the charter also stated that holding an official position was no defense to war crimes. Obedience to orders could only be considered in mitigation of punishment if the tribunal determined that justice so required.

The criminal procedure used by the tribunal was closer to civil law than to common law, with a trial before a panel of judges rather than a jury trial and with wide allowance for hearsay evidence. Defendants who were found guilty could appeal the verdict to the Allied Control Council. In addition, they would be permitted to present evidence in their defense and to cross-examine witnesses.

The charter was developed by the European Advisory Commission under the authority of the Moscow Declaration: Statement on Atrocities, which was agreed at the Moscow Conference (1943). It was drawn up in London, following the surrender of Germany on VE Day. It was drafted by Robert H. Jackson, Robert Falco, and Iona Nikitchenko of the European Advisory Commission and issued on 8 August 1945.

The charter and its definition of crimes against peace was also the basis of the Finnish law, approved by the Finnish parliament on 11 September 1945, that enabled the war-responsibility trials in Finland.

The agreement for the prosecution and punishment of the major war criminals of the European Axis and the annexed charter were formally signed by France, the Soviet Union, the United Kingdom, and the United States on 8 August 1945. The agreement and charter were subsequently ratified by 20 other Allied states.

See also
 Cases before the International Criminal Court
 Carl Schmitt
 Command responsibility
 Crime against humanity
 Crime against peace
 Geneva Conventions
 Genocide
 International humanitarian law
 International law
 Jus ad bellum
 Jus in bello
 List of war crimes
 Nuremberg principles
 Nuremberg trials
 Peace Palace
 Superior orders (Pre-Nuremberg history of "I was just following superior orders")
 War crimes
 War Crimes Act of 1996

References

External links
 Links to the International Conference on Military Trials : London, 1945. These documents helps to shows how the Charter reached its final form:
 Aide-Mèmoire from the Soviet Government June 14, 1945 contained in the Avalon Project archive at Yale Law School.
 1945 Amendments Proposed by the United Kingdom June 28, 1945. contained in the Avalon Project archive at Yale Law School.
 Nuremberg Trial Proceedings Vol. 1 Charter of the International Military Tribunal contained in the Avalon Project archive at Yale Law School
 Judgement: The Law Relating to War Crimes and Crimes Against Humanity contained in the Avalon Project archive at Yale Law School, contains the stated expansion of customary law "''the Convention Hague 1907 expressly stated that it was an attempt 'to revise the general laws and customs of war,' which it thus recognised to be then existing, but by 1939 these rules laid down in the Convention were recognised by all civilised nations, and were regarded as being declaratory of the laws and customs of war which are referred to in Article 6 (b) of the Charter."

International humanitarian law treaties
War crimes
International criminal law treaties
Politics of World War II
1945 in law
Crimes against humanity
Crime of aggression
International Military Tribunal in Nuremberg
World War II treaties
Treaties concluded in 1945
1945 in international relations
Treaties entered into force in 1945
1945 in London
Treaties of Argentina
Treaties of Belgium
Treaties of Czechoslovakia
Treaties of Denmark
Treaties of the Ethiopian Empire
Treaties of the Provisional Government of the French Republic
Treaties of the Kingdom of Greece
Treaties of Haiti
Treaties of Honduras
Treaties of British India
Treaties of Luxembourg
Treaties of the Netherlands
Treaties of New Zealand
Treaties of Norway
Treaties of Panama
Treaties of Paraguay
Treaties of the Polish People's Republic
Treaties of the Soviet Union
Treaties of the United Kingdom
Treaties of the United States
Treaties of Uruguay
Treaties of Venezuela
Treaties of Yugoslavia
Treaties establishing intergovernmental organizations
History of Nuremberg